De Wet Nel is a South African politician who has served as a Member of North West Provincial Legislature for the Freedom Front Plus since May 2019. In June 2019, he was appointed chairperson of the  Standing Committee on Oversight of the North West Provincial Legislature. Nel was previously a councillor of the Rustenburg Local Municipality.

Political career
Nel is a member of the Freedom Front Plus. He served as a councillor of the Rustenburg Local Municipality and as the chairperson of the municipality's municipal public accounts committee until his election to the North West Provincial Legislature in May 2019. He was sworn in as a member on 22 May 2019.

In June 2019, Nel was appointed chairperson of the Standing Committee on Oversight of the North West Provincial Legislature. He later resigned and was replaced by the DA's Jacqueline Theologo.

References

External links

Living people
Year of birth missing (living people)
Freedom Front Plus politicians
Members of the North West Provincial Legislature
Afrikaner people
People from Rustenburg
21st-century South African politicians